Lounge Lizards is an EP by Purling Hiss, released on June 14, 2011 by Mexican Summer.

Track listing

Personnel
Adapted from the Lounge Lizards liner notes.
 Mike Polizze – vocals, instruments

Release history

References

External links 
 Lounge Lizards at Discogs (list of releases)
 Lounge Lizards at Bandcamp

2011 EPs
Purling Hiss albums